William W. Brash III (born July 15, 1951) is an American judge serving on the Wisconsin Court of Appeals since 2015.  He was appointed by Governor Scott Walker after serving 15 years as a Wisconsin Circuit Court Judge in Milwaukee County.

Biography

Born in Panama and raised in Fox Point, Wisconsin, Brash received his B.A. degree from St. Norbert College in 1973 and his J.D. degree from Marquette University Law School in 1978. He practiced law and was a business owner. He served as a municipal judge in Fox Point from 1984 to 1997, and then as a reserve municipal judge for Milwaukee from 1997 until 2001.

In November 2001 he was appointed to the Wisconsin Circuit Court in Milwaukee County by Governor Scott McCallum. He was re-elected to the Circuit Court in 2002, 2008, and 2014. In 2015, Governor Scott Walker appointed Brash to the Wisconsin Court of Appeals to fill the vacancy created by his appointment of Judge Rebecca Bradley to the Wisconsin Supreme Court. Brash won a full term on the court without opposition in the spring election of 2017.  He is currently the Presiding Judge for District I. On June 28, 2021, the Wisconsin Supreme Court issued an order naming him the next chief judge, effective August 1, 2021.

Personal life
Judge Brash and his wife, Ruth, have one son and reside in Fox Point, Wisconsin.

Electoral history

Wisconsin Circuit Court (2002, 2008, 2014)

| colspan="6" style="text-align:center;background-color: #e9e9e9;"| General Election, April 2, 2002

Wisconsin Court of Appeals (2017)

| colspan="6" style="text-align:center;background-color: #e9e9e9;"| General Election, April 4, 2017

References

1951 births
Living people
People from Fox Point, Wisconsin
St. Norbert College alumni
Marquette University Law School alumni
Businesspeople from Wisconsin
Wisconsin Court of Appeals judges
Wisconsin state court judges
21st-century American judges